Richard L. Farley (April 13, 1932 – October 2, 1969) was an American professional basketball player.

A 6'4" (1.93 m) guard/forward from Winslow, Indiana, Farley played for the 1953 Indiana University national championship team. He also played three seasons (1954–1956; 1958–1959) in the National Basketball Association as a member of the Syracuse Nationals and Detroit Pistons.  He averaged 6.5 points per game in his career and won a league title with Syracuse in 1955.

Farley previously held the NBA record for the shortest amount of time on the floor before fouling out in a game, with five minutes' playing time, set on March 12, 1956. The record stood for 41 years until the Dallas Mavericks' Bubba Wells broke it by getting himself disqualified in just 3 minutes on December 29, 1997.

Farley died of cancer on October 2, 1969.

Notes

External links

Hoopedia biography
Winslow High website page 

1932 births
1969 deaths
American men's basketball players
Basketball players from Indiana
Detroit Pistons players
Indiana Hoosiers men's basketball players
People from Pike County, Indiana
Shooting guards
Small forwards
Syracuse Nationals draft picks
Syracuse Nationals players